Safelayer Secure Communications S.A. is a Spanish private company founded in May 1999. It develops software products on the public key infrastructure area (digital security for the identity management, electronic signature and data protection). Safelayer's technology is part of the three major certification and digital identity projects in Spain: Fábrica Nacional de Moneda y Timbre, the Spanish ID card DNI electrónico and the Spanish E-passport. Safelayer's technology also secures the NATO X400 messaging system''.

Safelayer's technology has been EAL2 and EAL4+ Common Criteria certified. Currently, Safelayer is the only company with a whole family of products CC EAL4+ certified.

Products 
 KeyOne CA: Certificate authority.
 KeyOne VA: Validation authority (OCSP responder) based on standard protocol OCSP from IETF.
 KeyOne TSA: Time-stamping authority (Trusted Timestamping) based on standard protocol TSP from IETF.
 KeyOne XRA: Registration authority.
 TrustedX eIDAS platform.
 TrustedX Authentication platform.
 TrustedX Electronic signature.
 TrustedX Encryption key management.

References

External links
 Safelayer's Website 

Companies based in Barcelona
Cryptography companies
Computer security software companies
Software companies established in 1999
Spanish companies established in 1999